Pierre-Hugues Herbert and Konstantin Kravchuk won the title, beating David Guez and Martin Vaïsse 6–1, 7–6(7–3)

Seeds

Draw

Draw

References
 Main Draw

Trophee des Alpilles - Doubles
2014 Doubles